Salfordville is an unincorporated community in Upper Salford Township in Montgomery County, Pennsylvania, United States. Salfordville is located at the intersection of Old Skippack Road and Wolford Road/Bergey Road.

References

Unincorporated communities in Montgomery County, Pennsylvania
Unincorporated communities in Pennsylvania